WMAA may refer to:

 Waste Management Association of Australia, Australia's main non-government association for waste management professionals
 Whitney Museum of American Art, a Modern art museum in Manhattan
 WMAA-LP, a low-power radio station (93.7 FM) licensed to serve Moca, Puerto Rico
 WMAA-TV, a television station in Mississippi
 World Martial Arts Association, promoting martial arts generally
 World Modern Arnis Association, promoting the Filipino martial art, Modern Arnis
 Western Martial Academies of Australia, promoting western martial arts in Australia